Bakers Mills is a hamlet in Warren County, New York, United States. Bakers Mills has a post office with ZIP code 12811.

References

Hamlets in Warren County, New York
Hamlets in New York (state)